FedEx Express Flight 1406 was an American domestic cargo flight from Memphis International Airport, Memphis, Tennessee, to Logan International Airport in Boston, Massachusetts, that suffered an in-flight cargo fire over New York on September 5, 1996. The three crew members and two passengers on board successfully evacuated after an emergency landing at Stewart International Airport in New Windsor, New York. After the evacuation, the DC-10 was consumed by fire. After an extensive investigation, the National Transportation Safety Board was unable to determine what caused the fire. Nevertheless, the Federal Aviation Administration made recommendations to prevent similar incidents from occurring in the future.

Aircraft
The aircraft involved was a McDonnell Douglas DC-10-10F, registered as N68055; it first flew in 1975, and after service with Continental Airlines, it joined the Federal Express fleet in 1980.

Crew

There were three crew members and two passengers on Flight 1406. The Captain (47), had 12,344 flight hours; the First Officer (41), had 6,535 flight hours; and the Flight Engineer (45) had 3,704 flight hours. Also on board were two FedEx employees (including Vietnam veteran and Eastern Air Lines pilot Frederick S. Olmsted Jr.) sitting in jumpseats.

Flight
Flight 1406 departed from Memphis International Airport at 3:42am, en route to Logan International Airport, Boston, Massachusetts, with an estimated time of arrival (ETA) of 7:42am.

Smoke detectors for several zones of the aircraft's main deck cargo compartment alerted the pilots of suspected smoke, prompting the crew members and passengers to don their smoke masks. Aircraft systems began to fail and the crew also noticed that smoke was entering the cockpit. The crew informed Boston Air Traffic Control (ATC) about the fire situation; ATC suggested that Flight 1406 could make an emergency landing at Albany County Airport,  ahead, or to land at Stewart International Airport in New Windsor,  behind. The crew decided to land at Stewart.

At 5:49am the aircraft was on approach to Stewart International Airport, where airport fire services prepared for the DC-10 to land on Runway 27. The aircraft successfully landed at the airport at 5:54am and turned onto a taxiway, where it came to a stop for the fire services to engage. The crew and the employees tried to evacuate the aircraft, but the doors and cockpit windows could not be opened because the fuselage was still pressurized. The captain then de-pressurized the aircraft and all occupants then exited safely; the flight crew through a cockpit window and the passengers through one of the forward fuselage cabin doors. The fire crews found the cargo prevented them from accessing the source of the smoke from inside the cabin and forty minutes after the aircraft landed the fire burned through the fuselage skin; the fire was extinguished four hours after the aircraft landed. All five people on board survived, though two members of the flight crew received minor injuries.

Investigation

Because the fire damage was extensive, a National Transportation Safety Board (NTSB) investigation was unable to find a source of ignition. On 22 July 1998, the NTSB released its report, concluding, "the probable cause of this accident was an in-flight cargo fire of undetermined origin".

See also
UPS Flight 6
Swissair Flight 111

References 

Aviation accidents and incidents in New York (state)
Aircraft fires
Accidents and incidents involving cargo aircraft
Airliner accidents and incidents with an unknown cause
Accidents and incidents involving the McDonnell Douglas DC-10
September 1996 events in the United States
Aviation accidents and incidents in the United States in 1996
1996 in New York (state)
New Windsor, New York
FedEx Express accidents and incidents
Airliner accidents and incidents caused by in-flight fires